Dona Mariquita of My Heart (Spanish: Doña Mariquita de mi corazón) is a 1953 Mexican comedy film directed by Joaquín Pardavé and starring Pardavé, Silvia Pinal and Fernando Fernández.

Cast
 Joaquín Pardavé as Ubaldo  
 Silvia Pinal as Paz Alegre  
 Fernando Fernández as Adolfo; Javier  
 Perla Aguiar as Mari Tere  
 Agustín Isunza as Leo  
 Óscar Pulido as Rogelio  
 Fanny Schiller as doña Micaela  
 Alfredo Varela as José Luis  
 Gloria Mange as Marisa  
 Emperatriz Carvajal as doña Mariquita 
 José Chávez 
 María Herrero as Rosa, sirvienta  
 Francisco Llopis 
 Carlos Robles Gil as Hombre bailando en cabaret  
 Manuel Trejo Morales
 Hernán Vera

References

Bibliography 
 Rogelio Agrasánchez. Beauties of Mexican Cinema. Agrasanchez Film Archive, 2001.

External links 
 

1953 films
1953 comedy films
Mexican comedy films
1950s Spanish-language films
Films directed by Joaquín Pardavé
Mexican black-and-white films
1950s Mexican films